Mathieu Lévesque is a Canadian politician, who was elected to the National Assembly of Quebec in the 2018 provincial election. He represents the electoral district of Chapleau as a member of the Coalition Avenir Québec.

References

Living people
Coalition Avenir Québec MNAs
Politicians from Gatineau
21st-century Canadian politicians
Year of birth missing (living people)